The "New Perspective on Paul" is a movement within the field of biblical studies concerned with the understanding of the writings of the Apostle Paul. The "new perspective" was started with liberal scholar E. P. Sanders' 1977 work Paul and Palestinian Judaism.
The old Protestant perspective claims that Paul advocates justification through faith in Jesus Christ over justification through works of the Law. After the Reformation, this perspective was known as sola fide; this was traditionally understood as Paul arguing that Christians' good works would not factor into their salvation – only their faith would count. In this perspective, first-century Second Temple Judaism is dismissed as sterile and legalistic.

According to Sanders, Paul's letters do not address general good works, but instead question observances such as circumcision, dietary laws, and Sabbath laws, which were the "boundary markers" that set the Jews apart from the other ethnic groups. According to Sanders, first-century Palestinian Judaism was not a "legalistic community," nor was it oriented to "salvation by works." As God's chosen people, they were under his covenant. Contrary to Protestant belief, following the Law was not a way of entering the covenant, but of staying within it.

Development
Since the Protestant Reformation, studies of Paul's writings have been heavily influenced by reformers' views that are said to ascribe the negative attributes that they associated with sixteenth-century Catholicism to Second Temple Judaism. These historic Protestant views on Paul's writings are called "the old perspective" by adherents of the "new perspective on Paul". The "new perspective" is an attempt to reanalyze Paul's letters and interpret them based on an understanding of first-century Judaism, taken on its own terms.

In 1963 Krister Stendahl, who is considered by modern scholarship to have been as influential as E.P. Sanders in the development of the "new perspective on Paul", published a paper arguing that the typical Lutheran view of Paul's theology did not align with statements in Paul's writings, and in fact was based on mistaken assumptions about Paul's beliefs rather than careful interpretation of his writings. Stendahl warned against imposing modern Western ideas on the Bible, and especially on the works of Paul. In 1977 E. P. Sanders, a liberal theologian and scholar, published Paul and Palestinian Judaism. In this work he studies Jewish literature and Paul's writings, arguing that the traditional Protestant understanding of the theology of Judaism and Paul was fundamentally incorrect.

Sanders continued to publish books and articles in this field, and was soon joined by the Wesleyan scholar James D. G. Dunn. Dunn reports that Anglican theologian N.T. Wright was the first to use the term "new perspective on Paul" in his 1978 Tyndale Lecture. The term became more widely known after being used by Dunn as the title of his 1982 Manson Memorial Lecture where he summarized and affirmed the movement. The work of these writers inspired a large number of scholars to study, discuss, and debate the relevant issues. Many books and articles dealing with the issues raised have since been published. N.T. Wright has written a large number of works aimed at popularising the "new perspective" outside of academia.

The "new-perspective" movement is closely connected with a surge of recent scholarly interest in studying the Bible in the context of other ancient texts, and the use of social-scientific methods to understand ancient culture. Scholars affiliated with The Context Group have called for various reinterpretations of biblical texts based on studies of the ancient world.

Main ideas 
It is often noted that the singular title "the new perspective" gives an unjustified impression of unity. It is a field of study in which many scholars are actively pursuing research and continuously revising their own theories in light of new evidence, and who do not necessarily agree with each other on any given issue. It has been suggested by many that a plural title of "new perspectives" may therefore be more accurate. In 2003, N. T. Wright, distancing himself from both Sanders and Dunn, commented that "there are probably almost as many 'new' perspective positions as there are writers espousing it – and I disagree with most of them". There are certain trends and commonalities within the movement, but what is held in common is the belief that the historic Lutheran and Reformed perspectives of Paul the Apostle and Judaism are fundamentally incorrect. The following are some of the issues being widely discussed.

Works of the Law 
Paul's letters contain a substantial amount of criticism regarding the "works of the Law". The radical difference in these two interpretations of what Paul meant by "works of the Law" is the most consistent distinguishing feature between the two perspectives. The historic Protestant perspectives interpret this phrase as referring to human effort to do good works in order to meet God's standards (Works Righteousness). In this view, Paul is arguing against the idea that humans can merit salvation from God by their good works alone (note that the "new" perspective agrees that we cannot merit salvation; the issue is what exactly Paul is addressing).

By contrast, new-perspective scholars see Paul as talking about "badges of covenant membership" or criticizing Gentile believers who had begun to rely on the Torah to reckon Jewish kinship. It is argued that in Paul's time, Israelites were being faced with a choice of whether to continue to follow their ancestral customs, the Torah, or to follow the Roman Empire's trend to adopt Greek customs (Hellenization, see also Antinomianism, Hellenistic Judaism, and Circumcision controversy in early Christianity). The new-perspective view is that Paul's writings discuss the comparative merits of following ancient Israelite or ancient Greek customs. Paul is interpreted as being critical of a common Jewish view that following traditional Israelite customs makes a person better off before God, pointing out that Abraham was righteous before the Torah was given. Paul identifies customs he is concerned about as circumcision, dietary laws, and observance of special days.

Human effort and good works 
Due to their interpretation of the phrase "works of the law," theologians of the historic Protestant perspectives see Paul's rhetoric as being against human effort to earn righteousness. This is often cited by Protestant and Reformed theologians as a central feature of the Christian religion, and the concepts of grace alone and faith alone are of great importance within the creeds of these denominations.

"New-perspective" interpretations of Paul tend to result in Paul having nothing negative to say about the idea of human effort or good works, and saying many positive things about both. New-perspective scholars point to the many statements in Paul's writings that specify the criteria of final judgment as being the works of the individual.

Wright, however, does not hold the view that good works contribute to one's salvation, but rather that the final judgment is something Christians can look forward to as a future vindication of God's present declaration of their righteousness. In other words, one's works are a product of one's salvation and future judgment will reflect that. Others tend to place a higher value on the importance of good works than the historic Protestant perspectives do, taking the view that they causally contribute to the salvation of the individual.

Advocates of the historic Protestant perspectives often see this as being "salvation by works", and as a bad thing, contradicting fundamental tenets of Christianity. New-perspective scholars often respond that their views are not so different. For in the perspective of Luther and Calvin, God graciously empowers the individual to the faith which leads to salvation and also to good works, while in the "new" perspective God graciously empowers individuals to the faith (demonstrated in good works), which leads to salvation.

See also Synergism in theosis in the Eastern Orthodox Church and Orthopraxy in Christianity.

Pistis Christou – 'faith in', or 'faithfulness of' 
An ongoing debate related to the "new" perspective has been over Paul's use of the Greek word pistis (πίστις, meaning "trust", "belief", "faith", or "faithfulness"). Writers with a more historic Protestant perspective have typically interpreted this word as meaning a belief in God and Christ, and trust in Christ for salvation with faith that he will save you. This interpretation is based on several passages from the Bible, notably the epistle to the Ephesians: "For by grace you have been saved through faith. And this is not your own doing; it is the gift of God, not as a result of works, so that no one may boast" (Eph. 2:9). E. P. Sanders has conceded that Ephesians 2:9 teaches the traditional perspective.

By contrast, many recent studies of the Greek word pistis have concluded that its primary and most common meaning was faithfulness, meaning firm commitment in an interpersonal relationship. As such, the word could be almost synonymous with "obedience" when the people in the relationship held different status levels (e.g. a slave being faithful to his master). Far from being equivalent to "lack of human effort", the word seems to imply and require human effort. The interpretation of Paul's writings that we need "faithfully" to obey God's commands is quite different from one which sees him saying that we need to have "faith" that he will do everything for us. This is also argued to explain why James was adamant that "faith without works is dead" and that "a man is justified by works, and not by faith alone" (Js. 2:24), while also saying that merely to believe places one on the same level as the demons (see James 2). The "new" perspective argues that James was concerned with those who were trying to reduce faith to an intellectual subscription without any intent to follow God or Jesus, and that Paul always intended "faith" to mean a full submission to God.

Another related issue is the pistis Christou ("faith of Christ") debate. Paul several times uses this phrase at key points in his writings and it is linguistically ambiguous as to whether it refers to faith in Christ ("objective genitive"), or Christ's own faithfulness to God ("subjective genitive"), or even Christians' faithfulness to God like that of Christ ("adjectival genitive"). There is wide disagreement within the academic community over which of these is the best rendering. The NET Bible translation became the first mainstream English Bible translation to use a subjective genitive translation ("the faithfulness of Jesus Christ") of this phrase.

Grace, or favor 
Writers with a more historic Protestant perspective have generally translated the Greek word charis as "grace" and understood it to refer to the idea that there is a lack of human effort in salvation because God is the controlling factor. However those who study ancient Greek culture have pointed out that "favor" is a better translation, as the word refers normally to "doing a favor". In ancient societies there was the expectation that such favors be repaid, and this semi-formal system of favors acted like loans. Gift giving corresponded with the expectation of reciprocity. Therefore, it is argued that when Paul speaks of how God did us a "favor" by sending Jesus, he is saying that God took the initiative, but is not implying a lack of human effort in salvation, and is in fact implying that Christians have an obligation to repay the favor God has done for them. Some argue that this view then undermines the initial "favor"—of sending Jesus—by saying that, despite his life, death and resurrection, Christians still have, as before, to earn their way to heaven. However, others note this is the horns of a false dilemma (all grace versus all works). Many new-perspective proponents that see "charis" as "favor" do not teach that Christians earn their way to heaven outside of the death of Christ. Forgiveness of sins through the blood of Christ is still necessary to salvation. But, that forgiveness demands effort on the part of the individual (cf. Paul in Phil. 3:12–16).

The Atonement 

To writers of the historic Protestant perspectives the penal substitution atonement theory and the belief in the "finished work" of Christ have been central. New-perspective writers have regularly questioned whether this view is really of such central importance in Paul's writings. Generally new-perspective writers have argued that other theories of the atonement are more central to Paul's thinking, but there has been minimal agreement among them as to what Paul's real view of the atonement might be.

The following is a broad sample of different views advocated by various scholars:
 E. P. Sanders argued that Paul's central idea was that we mystically spiritually participate in the risen Christ and that all Paul's judicial language was subordinate to the participatory language.
 N. T. Wright has argued that Paul sees Israel as representative of humanity and taking onto itself the sinfulness of humanity through history. Jesus, in turn, as Messiah is representative of Israel and so focuses the sins of Israel on himself on the cross. Wright's view is thus a "historicized" form of Penal Substitution.
 Chris VanLandingham has argued that Paul sees Christ as having defeated the Devil and as teaching humans how God wants them to live and setting them an example.
 David Brondos has argued that Paul sees Jesus as just a part in a wider narrative in which the Church is working to transform lives of individuals and the world, and that Paul's participatory language should be understood in an ethical sense (humans living Christ-like lives) rather than mystically as Sanders thought.
 Pilch and Malina take the view that Paul holds to the Satisfaction theory of atonement.
 Stephen Finlan holds that Paul uses numerous different metaphors to describe the atonement; "justified by his blood" (Rom 5:9) means that a cultic substance has a judicial effect. Paul also taught the transformation of believers into the image of God through Christ (Theosis).

Criticism 
The "new" perspective has been an extremely controversial subject and has drawn strong arguments and recriminations from both sides of the debate.

In 2003 Steve Chalke, after being influenced by new-perspective writers, published a book targeted at a popular audience which made comments that were interpreted as being highly critical of the penal substitution theory of the atonement. This caused an extensive and ongoing controversy among Evangelicals in Britain, with a strong backlash from laypeople and advocates of the historic Protestant traditions. Chalke's views drew much support as well as criticism, with numerous articles, blogs and books being written on both sides of the debate.

The continuing controversy led to the Evangelical Alliance organising a symposium in July 2005 to discuss the issue. A record of this symposium includes a chapter by Chalke and his views are also contained in "the atonement debate." A group of three conservative evangelical theologians responded to Chalke with their book, Pierced for our Transgressions (Crossway Publishing, 2007), which strongly criticised Chalke's position as inconsistent with some evangelical confessions of faith. However, N. T. Wright endorsed Chalke and spoke out against the latter book, commenting, for instance, that 'despite the ringing endorsements of famous men, it [Pierced For Our Transgressions] is deeply, profoundly, and disturbingly unbiblical.'

Both sides of the debate have attempted to claim the higher, and more accurate, view of scripture. New-perspective advocates claim that supporters of the historic Protestant views are too committed to historic Protestant tradition, and therefore fail to take a "natural" reading of the Bible; while those of the Protestant perspectives claim that new-perspective advocates are too intrigued by certain interpretations of context and history, which then lead to a biased hermeneutical approach to the text.

The "new" perspective has been heavily criticized by many scholars in the Reformed and Protestant tradition, arguing that it undermines the classical, individualistic, Augustinian interpretation of election and does not faithfully reflect the teachings of the Scriptures. It has been the subject of fierce debate among Evangelicals in recent years, mainly due to N. T. Wright's increasing popularity in evangelical circles.

Its most outspoken critics include, D. A. Carson, Douglas Moo, Tom Schreiner, Wayne Grudem, Robert J Cara, John Piper, Sinclair Ferguson, C. W. Powell, Mark A. Seifrid, Tom Holland, Ligon Duncan, among many others.

Barry D. Smith has claimed that the New Perspective's challenge to the traditional view of Jewish faith practice as legalistic is misplaced. Biblical passages which do describe the Jewish people as struggling with legalism and the concept of earning salvation by good works include Jesus' parable of the Pharisee and the Publican, and more importantly, Paul's own words in passages like Romans 4:4-5: "to the one who works his wages are not a gift but what is owed, but to the one who does not work but trusts in Him who justifies the ungodly, his faith is credited as righteousness." Paul also alludes to Deuteronomy 9:4, in which God warned the Jewish people not to think that he chose them because they were better than other people and deserved it, when he contrasts the righteousness of the law and the righteousness of faith in Romans 10:5-8.

In 2015 John M.G. Barclay published Paul and the Gift which re-frames Paul's theology of grace and, in doing so, provides a nuanced critique of the New Perspective.  The book has been praised for keeping grace at the center of Paul's theology (pace the New Perspective) while illuminating how grace, understood in light of ancient theories of gift, demands reciprocity and thus the formation of new communities based not on ethnicity but the unqualified Christ-gift (much like the New Perspective).

Catholic and Orthodox reactions 
The "new" perspective has, by and large, been an internal debate among Protestant scholars. Many Catholic and Eastern Orthodox writers have responded favorably to new-perspective ideas, seeing a greater commonality with certain strands of their own traditions. For some within the Catholic Church, the "new" perspective is seen as a step toward the progressive reality of human salvation in Christ. But for those who follow the exegesis of doctors and saints like Clement, John Chrysostom, Ambrose, Augustine, and Thomas Aquinas, the so-called "new perspective" is not welcomed as an accurate reading of the Pauline texts. Catholic scholar Joseph Fitzmyer has written a commentary on Romans that is decidedly Augustinian, contradicting the "new perspective" in many ways.

The increased importance new-perspective writers have given to good works in salvation has created strong common ground with many within the Catholic and Eastern Orthodox churches. Historic Protestantism has never denied that there is a place for good and faithful works, but has always excluded them from justification, which Protestants argue is through faith alone, and to which good deeds do not contribute, whether with or without God's grace. This has, since the Reformation, been a line of distinction between Protestantism (both Reformed and Lutheran) and other Christian communions.

See also

Pauline Christianity
Joint Declaration on the Doctrine of Justification
Paula Fredriksen
Daniel Boyarin

References

Notes

Further reading
 Badenas, Robert, Christ the End of the Law, Romans 10.4 in Pauline Perspective, 1985. 
 
 .
Dunn, James D. G., "The New Perspective on Paul", in: Jesus, Paul and the Law, 1990. 
Gathercole, Simon J., Where Is Boasting? Early Jewish Soteriology and Paul's Response in Romans 1–5, 2002. 
Gosdeck, David, Nicholas Thomas Wright – New Perspective on St. Paul, 2013, WLS Essays.
Irons, Lee, Seyoon Kim's Critique of the New Perspective on Paul, 2007.
Kim, Yung Suk. Christ's Body in Corinth: The Politics of a Metaphor 2008 
 
 Kok, Jacobus, The New Perspectives on Paul and its implication for ethics and mission, Acta Patristica, vol 21, 2010, pp. 3–17
Marshall, Taylor R. The Catholic Perspective on Paul, 2010.
 
Oropeza, B. J. and Scot McKnight, "Paul in Perspective: An Overview of the Landscape More Than Forty Years after Paul and Palestinian Judaism." Pages 1–23 in Perspectives on Paul: Five Views. (Baker Academic Books), 2020 
Smith, Barry D., What Must I Do to Be Saved? Paul Parts Company with His Jewish Heritage, 2007.
Thompson, Michael B., The New Perspective on Paul (Grove Biblical Series), 2002. .
Wright, N.T., What St Paul Really Said, 1997.
 .
 .
Yinger, Kent L., The New Perspective on Paul: An Introduction, (Cascade Books), 2010 
Young, Brad, Paul the Jewish Theologian, 1998

External links

The Paul Page—Extensive list of online articles relating to the New Perspective
Galatians, Paul, the Torah-Law and Legalism
Theopedia: New Perspective on Paul—Traditional Reformed perspective
Report on Justification Presented to the 73rd General Assembly (Orthodox Presbyterian Church)
Mississippi Valley Presbytery Report (Presbyterian Church in America)
Catholic Perspective on Paul—A Catholic analysis of topics pertaining to the New Perspective on Paul
WELS Topical Q&A: New Perspective on Paul—A Confessional Lutheran evaluation of the New Perspective

Paul the Apostle
Biblical studies
New Testament theology
Bible-related controversies
Christian terminology
Mosaic law in Christian theology